Coney Hill Rugby Football Club is an English rugby union team based in Gloucester, Gloucestershire. The club run three senior teams and three junior teams — under-17s, under-16s and under-12s. The first currently play in Western Counties North - a level seven league in the English rugby union system - following their relegation from South West 1 West at the end of the 2018-19 season.

History
The club was formed in 1947 by soldiers returning home from Dunkerque after the Second World War.

Honours
1st team:
 North Gloucestershire Combination Senior Cup winners (17): 1949, 1954, 1984, 1985, 1986, 1998, 2002, 2003, 2004, 2005, 2006, 2007, 2008, 2009, 2010, 2011, 2013
 Gloucestershire/Somerset champions: 1996–97
 Western Counties North champions (4): 1999–00, 2002–03, 2014–15, 2017–18
 South West 2 West champions: 2006–07
 South West Intermediate Cup winners: 2018

2nd team:
North Gloucestershire Combination Junior Cup winners (12): 1950, 1951, 1984, 1986, 2000, 2005, 2006, 2007, 2008, 2009, 2010, 2011, 2012

3rd team:
North Gloucestershire Combination Glanville Cup winners (11): 1977, 1987, 2002, 2006, 2007, 2009, 2010, 2011, 2012, 2014, 2016

References

External links
 Official club website

English rugby union teams
Sport in Gloucester
1947 establishments in England
Rugby clubs established in 1947
Rugby union in Gloucestershire